The Lithuanian Aviation Museum is located in Kaunas, Lithuania. The museum was officially opened in 1983. The permanent collection of the museum contains more than 18 000 displays of different fields of technology. The major part of the collection is dedicated to the history of aviation in Lithuania. It includes about 40 flying machines, models of airplanes, flyers, gliders and helicopters of various times, and designed during the Interwar period of Lithuania first combat aircraft the ANBO I by General Antanas Gustaitis.

The museum is located at the airfield where the aviators Darius and Girėnas were expected to land following their trans-atlantic flight.  However, the remains of their plane are on display in the Vytautas the Great War Museum, rather than at the aviation museum.

The museum organizes exhibitions, exchanges publications with aviation museums, historians in different countries of the world.

Exhibits

References

Museums in Kaunas
Aerospace museums